Elliot Simmons (born 5 February 1998) is an English professional footballer who currently plays for Vancouver FC of the Canadian Premier League.

Club career

Early career
Simmons began playing football at age six with Goulbourn in Ottawa and later joined the development programme of the Ottawa Fury. At age ten, he attended a scouting camp led by English Premier League side West Ham United in Toronto and later trialed with West Ham and Arsenal.

At age eleven, Simmons returned to England to join the academy of League One side Milton Keynes Dons. After five years with MK Dons, he switched to La Liga side Málaga.

Dalkurd
In 2017, Simmons signed his first professional contract with Swedish Allsvenskan side Dalkurd FF, where he played for the under-19 and under-21 teams.

Loan to MP
In 2018, Simmons was sent on a full-year loan to Finnish Kakkonen side Mikkelin Palloilijat and made twenty appearances that season, including fifteen starts.

HFX Wanderers
On 22 January 2019, Simmons returned to Canada and signed with Canadian Premier League side HFX Wanderers. On 11 May 2019, he made his professional debut as a starter in a 1–0 loss to Valour FC. On 14 December 2019, the club announced that Simmons would not be returning for the 2020 season.

Cavalry FC
On 26 February 2020, Simmons signed with Cavalry FC. He made his debut as a substitute in Cavalry's first game of the 2020 Canadian Premier League season against Forge FC. He would appear in all 10 games in the 2020 season, and would train with Allsvenskan club Östersunds FK in the offseason. In November 2020, Simmons would re-sign with the club for the 2021 season. In January 2022, it was announced Simmons would return for the 2022 season, his third with the club. Cavalry would announce that Simmons would leave the club upon completion of the 2022 season.

Vancouver FC
In December 2022, Simmons joined CPL expansion side Vancouver FC. In January 2023, Simmons joined Championship club Huddersfield Town on a training stint.

International career
Simmons is eligible to represent Canada and England internationally. Simmons attended camps for the Canada under-20 team in 2015 and 2017 but did not make the squad for the 2017 CONCACAF U-20 Championship.

Personal life
Simmons was born in Luton, England, to English parents. At age five, he and his family emigrated to Canada and settled in the Ottawa suburb of Stittsville.

References

External links

1998 births
Living people
Association football midfielders
Canadian soccer players
English footballers
Footballers from Luton
Soccer players from Ottawa
English emigrants to Canada
Naturalized citizens of Canada
Canadian expatriate soccer players
English expatriate footballers
Expatriate footballers in Spain
Canadian expatriate sportspeople in Spain
English expatriate sportspeople in Spain
Expatriate footballers in Sweden
Canadian expatriate sportspeople in Sweden
English expatriate sportspeople in Sweden
Expatriate footballers in Finland
Canadian expatriate sportspeople in Finland
English expatriate sportspeople in Finland
Expatriate sportspeople in England
Dalkurd FF players
Mikkelin Palloilijat players
HFX Wanderers FC players
Cavalry FC players
Kakkonen players
Canadian Premier League players
Vancouver FC players